Jarvis J. Russell (born October 12, 1998) is an American football middle linebacker for the Tampa Bay Buccaneers of the National Football League (NFL). He played college football at Memphis.

Early years 
Russell was born October 12, 1998 in Grenada, Mississippi, where he attended Grenada High School.

College career
In 2017, Russell enrolled at the University of Memphis. In 2021, he led the Tigers with 123 tackles, being named first-team All-AAC.

Professional career
Russell went undrafted in the 2022 NFL Draft but signed with the Buccaneers as an undrafted free agent on May 2, 2022. He was waived on August 30 but re-signed to the practice squad on August 31. On October 27 Russell was elevated to the active roster and made his NFL debut against the Baltimore Ravens playing 26 snaps. He was signed to the active roster on November 2. He was waived on November 26 and re-signed to the practice squad. He was promoted to the active roster on December 27. He was waived on January 16, 2023, then signed a reserve/future contract two days later.

References

Living people
1998 births
American football linebackers
Memphis Tigers football players
Tampa Bay Buccaneers players